Operation Vittles is a 1948 American short documentary film about the Berlin Airlift. It was nominated for an Academy Award for Best Documentary Short. The film was preserved by the Academy Film Archive, in conjunction with the UCLA Film and Television Archive, in 2013.

References

External links

Operation Vittles at the National Archives and Records Administration

1948 films
1948 short films
1948 documentary films
1940s short documentary films
American short documentary films
American black-and-white films
American aviation films
Documentary films about Berlin
Cold War films
1940s English-language films
1940s American films